Andrea Grandoni (born 23 March 1997) is a Sanmarinese football player who plays as a defender for La Fiorita.

Career

Grandoni debuted with the senior national team on 1 September 2017 in a 2018 FIFA World Cup qualification against Northern Ireland.

External links

1997 births
Living people
Sammarinese footballers
San Marino international footballers
Association football defenders
A.S.D. Victor San Marino players